Light Hall School is a secondary school  located in Shirley, West Midlands, England.

Light Hall School was established on Hathaway Road in the 1963 as a boys' grammar school on land once belonging to Light Hall Farm.

Light Hall School is one of sixteen secondary schools in the UK Metropolitan Borough of Solihull. The school has over 1,170 students, from ages eleven to sixteen.

The school suffered from a fire in February 2006; a new building was opened in October 2008 to replace the destroyed classrooms. The new building has classrooms for mathematics, English, music and drama. It also has a new dining hall, library, media studies classrooms and offices. The Design and Technology Block was refurbished in April 2013 with a new CAD/CAM room which has a laser and 3D printers.

References

External links
School's website

Academies in Solihull
Secondary schools in Solihull